According to the 2011 Census of India, around 2.9 million people in India did not state their religion and were counted in the "religion not stated". They were 0.24% of India's population. Their number have significantly increased 4 times from 0.7 million in 2001 census at an average annual rate of 15%. According to the 2012 WIN-Gallup Global Index of Religion and Atheism report, 81% of Indians were religious, 13% were non-religious, 3% were convinced atheists, and 3% were unsure or did not respond. While a demographic study by Cambridge University Press in 2004, have found that there are 102.87 million atheists and agnostics living in India, thus constituting 
9.1% of the total population, out of total 1.1296 billion people respectively.

Atheism and agnosticism have a long history in India and flourished within the Śramaṇa movement. Indian religions like Jainism, Hinduism and Buddhism consider atheism to be acceptable.

India has produced some notable atheist politicians and social reformers.

History

Ancient India
Several śramaṇa movements are known to have existed in India before the 6th century BCE (pre-Buddha, pre-Mahavira), and these influenced both the āstika and nāstika traditions of Indian philosophy. Martin Wiltshire states that the Śramaṇa tradition evolved in India over two phases, namely Paccekabuddha and Savaka phases, the former being the tradition of individual ascetic and latter of disciples, and that Buddhism and Jainism ultimately emerged from these as sectarian manifestations. These traditions drew upon already established Brahmanical concepts, states Wiltshire, to formulate their own doctrines. Reginald Ray concurs that Śramaṇa movements already existed and were established traditions in pre-6th century BCE India, but disagrees with Wiltshire that they were nonsectarian before the arrival of Buddha.

Schools of Philosophy

In Indian philosophy, there are six major orthodox (astika) schools of Hindu philosophy—Nyaya, Vaisheshika, Samkhya, Yoga, Mīmāṃsā and Vedanta, and five major heterodox (nāstika) schools of Śramaṇa —Jain, Buddhist, Ajivika, Ajñana, and Cārvāka. The four most studied Nāstika schools, those rejecting the doctrine of Vedas, are Jainism, Buddhism, Cārvāka, and Ājīvika.

Charvaka

The Cārvāka school originated in India around the 6th century BCE. It is classified as a nāstika school. It is noteworthy as evidence of a materialistic movement in ancient India. Followers of this school only accepted pratyakşa (perception) as a valid pramāna (evidence). They considered other pramāna like sabda (testimony), upamāna (analogy), and anumāna (inference) as unreliable. Thus, the existence of a soul (ātman) and God were rejected, because they could not be proved by perception. They also considered everything to be made of four elements: earth, water, air and fire. The Cārvāka pursued enjoyment of life and elimination of physical pain. So, they can be considered hedonistic. All of the original Cārvāka texts are considered lost. A much quoted sūtra (Barhaspatya sutras) by Brhaspati, who is considered the founder of the school, is thought to be lost. The Tattvopaplavasimha by Jayarāśi Bhaṭṭa (8th century CE) and the Sarvadarśanasaṅ̇graha by Madhavacarya (13th century) are considered important secondary Cārvāka texts.

Samkhya

Sāṃkhya is an āstika school, but has some atheistic elements. Sāṃkhya is a radically dualist philosophy. They believed that the two ontological principles, puruṣa (consciousness) and prakriti (matter), to be the underlying foundation of the universe. The objective of life is considered the achievement of separation of pure consciousness from matter (kaivalya). The reasoning within this system led to the Nir-isvara Sāṃkhya (Sāṃkhya without God) philosophy, which deemed the existence of God as unnecessary. There is the opposing reasoning which accepts God, called Sesvara Sankhya (Sāṃkhya with God). Samkhya Karika (c. 350 CE) is the earliest known systematic text of this philosophy.

Mīmāṃsā

Mīmāṃsā (meaning exegesis) is also an astika school. They believed the Vedas to be author-less and self-authenticating. They did not accept the Vedas as being composed by any ṛishi (saint), they considered them to not be authored by anyone (apauruṣeya). They accepted the minor deities of the Vedas but resisted any notion of a Supreme Creator. They only concentrated on upholding the ṛta (order) by following the duties of the Vedas. The foundational text of this school is the Mīmāṃsā Sutra by Jaimini (c. 200 BCE - 200 CE).

Ājīvika

Ājīvika is yet another nastika school with an atheistic outlook. None of their scriptures survive and there is some question as to whether or not the accounts of them in secondary sources (often hostile) are accurate. They believed in a naturalistic atomic theory and held that the consequence of natural laws led to a deterministic universe. They denied karma, but upheld the atman. They lived in ascetic communities and existed in southern India until at least the 14th century.

Buddhism and Jainism

Jainism rejects the idea of a creator deity responsible for the manifestation, creation, or maintenance of this universe. According to Jain doctrine, the universe and its constituents (soul, matter, space, time, and principles of motion) have always existed. All the constituents and actions are governed by universal natural laws and an immaterial entity like God cannot create a material entity like the universe. Jainism offers an elaborate cosmology, including heavenly beings (devas), but these beings are not viewed as creators; they are subject to suffering and change like all other living beings, and must eventually die. Jains define godliness as the inherent quality of any soul characterising infinite bliss, infinite power, Kevala Jnana (pure infinite knowledge) and Perfect peace. However, these qualities of a soul are subdued due to karmas of the soul. One who achieves this state of soul through right belief, right knowledge and right conduct can be termed a god. This perfection of soul is called kevalin. A soul thus becomes a liberated soul – liberated of miseries, cycles of rebirth, world, karmas and finally liberated of body as well. This is called moksha.

Gautama Buddha rejected the existence of a creator deity, refused to endorse many views on creation and stated that questions on the origin of the world are not ultimately useful for ending suffering. Buddhism instead emphasises the system of causal relationships underlying the universe, pratītyasamutpāda, which constitute the dhamma and source of enlightenment. No dependence of phenomena on a supernatural reality is asserted in order to explain the behaviour of matter.

Philosophers and ancient texts
Ajita Kesakambali was a materialist philosopher. He is mentioned in the Samaññaphala Sutta. He rejected gods, an afterlife and karma. Payasi is a character, referred to as a prince, who appears in the Buddhist text Digha Nikaya in the Payasi Sutta. He didn't believe in rebirth or karma. He debated Kassapa, a disciple of Buddha, and lost according to Buddhist sources.

Jabali's speech from the Ramayana

In the Hindu epic Ramayana (Ayodhya Khanda), when Bharata goes to the forest to convince Rama to return home, he was accompanied by a sophist called Jabali (""). Jabali uses nihilistic reasoning to convince Rama. He also says that rituals are a waste of food and scriptures were written by smart men so that people will give alms. But Rama calls him a deviant from the path of dharma (""), refuses to accept his "nastika" views and blame his own father for taking Jabali into service. He also equates the Buddha to a thief. On hearing Rama's retort, Jabali retracts his statements, saying that he was merely arguing like a nihilist. However, these verses referring to the Buddha are considered a later interpolation, as those verses use a different metre.

The Carvaka incident in the Mahabharata
A character described as a Carvaka briefly appears in the Mahabharata (in the Shanti Parva). As Yudhishthira enters the city of Hastinapur, a brahmin, referred to as Carvaka, accuses him of killing his own kinsmen and says that he would suffer for it. The accuser is revealed to a rakshasa in disguise, who was a friend of Duryodhana. He had existed since the Satya Yuga by virtue of a boon from the god Brahma, that he could only be killed when he is showing contempt towards brahmins. He was killed by other brahmins by the chanting of sacred hymns and Yudhishthira was assured that his actions were within the kshatriya code. This event may be a possible denigration of the Carvaka philosophy.

Medieval India
In the 9th century CE, Jain philosopher Jinasena wrote the Mahapurana. The book contains the following often quoted words,

This quote was also featured later in Carl Sagan's book, Cosmos. In the 14th century, philosopher Madhavacarya wrote the Sarvadarśanasaṅ̇graha, which is a compilation of all Indian philosophies, including Carvaka, which is described in the first chapter.

Modern India

19th century

Between 1882 and 1888, the Madras Secular Society published a magazine called The Thinker (Tattuvavivesini in Tamil) from Madras. The magazine carried articles written by anonymous writers and republished articles from the journal of the London Secular Society, which the Madras Secular Society considered itself affiliated to.

20th century
 
Periyar E. V. Ramasamy (1879 - 1973) was an atheist and rationalist leader of Self-Respect Movement and Dravidar Kazhagam. His views on irreligion are based on the eradication of the caste system, religion must be denied to achieve the obliteration of caste system.

Vinayak Damodar Savarkar (1883 –1966) was an eminent Hindu nationalist leader of the Indian independence movement. He was also an atheist and a staunch rationalist who disapproved of orthodox Hindu belief, dismissing cow worship as superstitious. Being Hindu, for him, was a cultural and political identity.

Jawaharlal Nehru (1889–1964), India's first Prime Minister was a Hindu agnostic and a self-styled scientific humanist. He wrote in his autobiography, Toward Freedom (1936), about his views on religion and superstition.

Meghnad Saha (1893 – 1956) was an atheist astrophysicist best known for his development of the Saha equation, used to describe chemical and physical conditions in stars.

Bhagat Singh (1907-1931), an Indian revolutionary and socialist nationalist who was hanged for using violence against British government officials, was a staunch atheist. He laid out his views in the essay Why I Am an Atheist, written in jail shortly before his execution.

Goparaju Ramachandra Rao (1902-1975), better known by his nom de guerre "Gora," was a social reformer, anti-caste activist, atheist and desciple of Mahatma Gandhi. He and his wife, Saraswathi Gora (1912-2007) who was also an atheist and social reformer, founded the Atheist Centre in 1940. The Atheist Centre is an institute working for social change. Gora expounded his philosophy of positive atheism as a way of life. He later wrote more about positive atheism in his 1972 book, Positive Atheism. Gora also organised the first World Atheist Conference in 1972. Subsequently, the Atheist Centre has organised several World Atheist Conferences in Vijayawada and other locations.

Khushwant Singh (1915-2014), a prominent and prolific writer, of Sikh extraction, was avowedly non-religious.

In 1997, the Federation of Indian Rationalist Associations was founded.

21st century

Amartya Sen (1933-), an Indian economist, philosopher and Nobel laureate, is an atheist and he holds that this can be associated with one of the atheist schools in Hinduism, the Lokayata.

Sunday Sapiens, the successor of Maharashtra Rationalist Association, is actively involved in developing scientific temper and eradicating superstition.

In 2008, the website Nirmukta was founded. It later became an organisation aiming to promote free thought and secular humanism in India.

In 2009, historian Meera Nanda published a book entitled "The God Market". It examines how Hindu religiosity is gaining more popularity among the rising middle class, as India is liberalising the economy and adopting globalisation.

In March 2009, in Kerala, a pastoral letter addressing the laity was issued by the Kerala Catholic Bishops' Council urging the members to not vote for political parties which advocate atheism. In July 2010, another similar letter was issued.

On 10 March 2012, Sanal Edamaruku investigated a so-called miracle in Vile Parle, where a Jesus statue had started weeping and concluded that the problem was caused by faulty drainage. Later that day, during a TV discussion with some church members, Edamaruku accused the Catholic Church of miracle-mongering. On 10 April, Angelo Fernandes, President of the Maharashtra Christian Youth Forum, filed a police complaint against Edamaruku under the Indian Penal Code Section 295A. In July while on a tour in Finland, Edamaruku was informed by a friend that his house was visited by the police. Since the offence is not bailable, Edamaruku stayed in Finland.

On Friday 7 July 2013, the first "Hug an Atheist Day" was organised in India by Nirmukta. The event aimed to spread awareness and reduce the stigma associated with being an atheist.

On 20 August 2013, Narendra Dabholkar, a rationalist and anti-superstition campaigner, was shot dead by two unknown assailants, while he was out on a morning walk.

On 9th Jan 2021, E.A.Jabbar, freethinker, atheist, and rationalist from Kerala and Islamic preacher M.M. Akbar were engaged in a debate on Quran. Both sides claimed to have defeated the other debater even as there was no clear verdict. Manoj John, an internationally reputed atheist activist, was dragged into a controversy after Liyakhathali CM alleged that the former took money from M.M. Akbar to tilt the debate in Akbar's favour. International atheist organisations immediately conducted a four-month long investigation and absolved Manoj John of having any link with Islamic organisations or having accepted money from them. It later turned out to be a false allegation to tarnish Manoj John's rising reputation and recognition in the global freethought movement, showing at the same time the dissaray among the irreligion camp in Kerala state of India.

In August 2021, Abdul Khader Puthiyangadi, an Indian citizen, a rationalist from Kerala, He was arrested by UAE police in 2021 without bail and sentenced to prison in UAE for 3 years for criticizing Islam on social media in his native language Malayalam. Liyakhathali CM, who was working towards the release of Puthiyangadi without authorisation by the latter's family, has been accused of unauthorised and intransparent fund collection for this purpose by many secular activists but the allegations have not yet been proven.

On 10 January 2022, ex-Muslim rationalist Aneesh Jasy from Tamil Nadu was arrested without bail citing his Facebook posts against Islam

Rise of ex-Muslims of Kerala 
In 2021 in Kerala, several ex-Muslims formed an organisation called Ex-Muslims of Kerala. It is an organisation founded in 2021 by E. A. Jabbar, Liyakkathali CM, Arif Hussain, and a few others who left Islam in Kerala. The organisation gives support to those who left Islam, a minority that is facing persecution from the Islamic community, just because they left the religion. The organisation conducts debates with Islamic scholars and fundamentalists on various topics. Ex-Muslim of Kerala observes 9 January as ex-Muslim day, by conducting seminars on atheism and Islam.

Legal status, rights and laws 
Atheism and irreligion are not officially recognised in India. Apostasy is allowed under the right to freedom of religion in the Constitution, and the Special Marriage Act, 1954 allows the marriage of people with no religious beliefs, as well as non-religious and non-ritualistic marriages. However, there are no specific laws catering to atheists and they are considered as belonging to the religion of their birth for administrative purposes. The box in which the 'caste' and 'religion' are to be filled is still present in a lot of forms. Some of these boxes on forms are also compulsory, and one does not always have the option of leaving them empty. The closest option one gets is 'Choose not to say' or 'Other' as an answer to these boxes.

Ravi Kumar, an atheist from Haryana is another person who is struggling and fighting to be officially and legally irreligious and caste-less in India. He went to court to declare him officially atheist and he got one certificate in which it was mentioned that he had "No Caste, No Religion, & No God". Later, Justice Tejinder Singh Dhindsa of the Punjab and Haryana High Court said they had exceeded their authority and asked heim to return the certificate; he refused to do so. The Fatehabad district authorities who issued the certificate withdrew it in April 2019. Kumar plans to continue his quest to be officially declared an atheist.

Sneha Parthibaraja, a lawyer from Vellore was the first citizen in India to get an official 'no religion, no caste' certificate. She won this right on February 5, 2019, after a 9-year court battle. Indian actor Kamal Haasan, who is known for his atheism, congratulated her on Twitter for this achievement.

Hate speech laws and irreligion

Notable verdicts

On 29 October 2013, the Bombay High Court judged in favour of an atheist school teacher from Nashik. Sanjay Salve had been employed by the state-funded Savitribai Phule Secondary School since 1996. In June 2007, during a prayer session, Salve didn't fold his hands during the pledge or prayer. The school management called this indiscipline and refused him a higher pay grade in 2008 when Salve became eligible for it. Salve sought legal recourse citing the article 28 (a) of the Constitution which states "no person attending any educational institution recognised by the State or receiving aid out of State funds shall be required to take part in any religious instruction that may be imparted in such institution or to attend any religious worship that may be conducted in such institution". The court ruled in Salve's favour and directed the school to release his dues by 31 January 2014.

On 23 September 2014, the Bombay High Court declared that the government cannot force a person to state a religion on any document or form. The court also stated any citizen has the right to declare that he/she doesn't belong to any religion. The decision came in response to a Public Interest Litigation (PIL) filed by Ranjit Mohite, Kishore Nazare and Subhash Ranware, representing an organisation called Full Gospel Church of God, after the Maharashtra state printing press refused to issue them a gazette notification stating that they belonged to no religion. The petitioners stated that the organisation had 4000 members, and that they believe in Jesus Christ but they do not follow Christianity or any religion. Responding to the petition, the Maharashtra and the central governments had stated that "no religion" cannot be treated as a religion on official forms. The court cited the Article 25 of the Constitution, which guarantees right to freedom of conscience, while passing the verdict.

Persecution and attacks

Narendra Nayak, an advocate of atheism, has claimed to have been attacked three times and had his scooter damaged twice, with one of the attacks leaving him with head injuries. This compelled him to take self-defence lessons and carry a nunchaku. Megh Raj Mitter's house was surrounded by a mob after he debunked the Hindu milk miracle, forcing him to call the police.

In December 2013, an FIR was filed against Nasrin in Bareilly by a cleric named Hasan Raza Khan, for hurting religious sentiments. Nasrin had allegedly tweeted on Twitter that "In India, criminals who issue fatwas against women don't get punished." Raza Khan said that by accusing clerics of being criminals, Nasrin had hurt religious sentiments.

On 2 July 2011, the house of U. Kalanathan, secretary of the Kerala Yukthivadi Sangham, was attacked in Vallikunnu after he suggested on television that the temple treasures of Padmanabhaswamy Temple should be used for public welfare. On 20 August 2013, Narendra Dabholkar, a rationalist and anti-superstition campaigner, was assassinated.

On 16 February 2015, rationalist Govind Pansare and his wife were attacked by unknown gunmen. He later died from the wounds on 20 February. On 30 August 2015, M. M. Kalburgi, a scholar and rationalist, was shot dead at his home. He was known for his criticism of superstition and idol worship. Soon afterwards, another rationalist and author, K. S. Bhagwan, received a threatening letter. He had offended religious groups by criticizing the Gita.

In March 2017, 31-year-old A Farooq, an Indian Muslim youth from Coimbatore who became an atheist, was killed by members of a Muslim radical group.

Demographics

Indian government census
The Indian census does not explicitly count atheists. In the 2011 Census of India, the response form required the respondent to choose from six options under religion. The "Others" option was meant for minor or tribal religions as well as atheists and agnostics.

The religion data from 2011 Census of India was released in August 2015. It revealed that about 2,870,000 people had stated no religion in their response, about 0.27% of the nation's population. However, the number included atheists, rationalists and also those who believed in a higher power. K. Veeramani, a Dravidar Kazhagam leader, said that it was the first time the number of non-religious people was recorded in the census. However, he added that he believed that the number of atheists in India was actually higher as many people don't reveal their atheism out of fear.

Different surveys

World Values Survey (2006)

According to the 2006 World Values Survey, conducted by the Dentsu Communication Institute Inc, Japan Research Center (2006), 6.6% of Indians stated that they had no religion.

WIN-Gallup Global Index of Religion and Atheism

According to the 2005 Global Index of Religion and Atheism report from WIN-Gallup, 87% of Indians were religious and 4% called themselves atheists. According to the 2012 report by the same organisation, 81% of Indians were religious, 13% were non-religious, 3% were convinced atheists and 3% were unsure or did not respond.

Worldviews and Opinions of Scientists in India (2007)

In 2007, a survey was conducted by the Institute for the Study of Secularism in Society and culture of the Trinity College with the help of Center for Inquiry (India) called Worldviews and Opinions of Scientists in India. 1100 scientists surveyed from 130 institutes. Most of them identified themselves as secular (59%) or somewhat secular (16%) but refused to be labelled irreligious. 83% defined secularism, as it appears in the Indian constitutions, as the separation of state and religion. But, 93% also defined it as tolerance of other religious philosophies. 20% equated secularism to atheism. Only 11% called themselves completely not spiritual. However, 8% reportedly said they would refuse to do stem cell research based on religious or moral convictions. Y. S. Rajan commented on this saying that most Indians don't feel there is a conflict between science and religion. Other the hand, Innaiah Narisetti, chairman of Centre for Inquiry (India) and Pushpa Bhargava, the former director of the Centre for Cellular and Molecular Biology, pointed out the lack of scientific temper among Indian scientists.

Religion Among Scientists in an International Context (2014)
In a survey conducted by Elaine Howard Ecklund of Rice University, it was found that:

The ongoing study has surveyed 1,581 scientists from UK and 1,763 from India.

See also 
 Atheism in Hinduism
 Freedom of religion in India
 Hate speech laws in India
 Irreligion 
 Religion in India
 Religious skepticism 
 Secular humanism 
 Secularism in India
 Superstition in India

References

Further reading

External links

 

 
Religion in India
Religious demographics
India
Atheism